Rybar may refer to:
 Rybár, a Slovak surname
 Rybář, a Czech surname

See also
 
Rebar (disambiguation)
United States v. Rybar, a U.S. Court of Appeals case